In world politics, Jewish state is a characterization of Israel as the nation-state and sovereign homeland of the Jewish people.

Modern Israel came into existence on 14 May 1948 as a polity to serve as the homeland for the Jewish people. It was also defined in its declaration of independence as a "Jewish state", a term that also appeared in the United Nations Partition Plan for British Palestine in 1947.  The related term of "Jewish and democratic state" dates from a 1992 legislation by Israel's Knesset.

Since its establishment, Israel has passed many laws which reflect on the Jewish identity and values of the majority (about 75% in 2016) of its citizens. However, the secular-versus-religious debate in Israel in particular has focused debate on the Jewish nature of the state; another aspect of the debate is the status of minorities in Israel, most notably that of the Arab-Israeli population.

In pre-modern times, the religious laws of Judaism defined a number of prerogatives for a Halakhic state. However, when Theodor Herzl wrote Der Judenstaat in 1896 which birthed the Jewish movement of Zionism, he envisioned a state based on European models, which included religious institutions under the aegis of the state. In order to avoid alienating the Ottoman Sultan, there was no explicit reference to a Jewish state by the Zionist Organization that he founded. The phrase "national home" was used intentionally instead of "state".

The 1942 Biltmore Program of the Zionist Organization explicitly proposed "that Palestine be established as a Jewish Commonwealth". In 1946, the Anglo-American Committee of Inquiry, also known as the Grady–Morrison Committee, noted that the demand for a Jewish state went beyond the obligations of either the Balfour Declaration or the British Mandate, and had been expressly disowned by the chairman of the Jewish Agency as recently as 1932.

The United Nations Partition Plan for Palestine, which brought the British Mandate to an end in 1948, referred to a "Jewish state" and an "Arab state" in its plans for land allotment.

The term Jewish state has been in common usage in the media since the establishment of Israel, and the term has also been used interchangeably with Israel. George W. Bush used the term in his speeches and in an exchange of letters with Israeli prime minister Ariel Sharon in 2004. Barack Obama has also used the phrase, for instance in a speech in September 2010 to the United Nations General Assembly. The Israeli government under prime minister Ehud Olmert made the recognition of Israel as a Jewish state by the State of Palestine a pre-condition in the peace negotiations, as did the government of his successor, Benjamin Netanyahu. However, Palestinians regard the demand for Jewish-state recognition as a trap—a new demand that did not come up during years of negotiations in the 1990s or in peace treaties reached with Egypt and with Jordan. The Palestine Liberation Organization recognized the State of Israel as part of the Oslo Accords in 1993. Palestinians regard acceptance of the demand as giving up their right of return.

On 19 July 2018, with a vote of 62 to 55 (2 abstained), the Knesset adopted a new Basic Law that defines Israel as the nation-state of the Jewish people.

Religious status

Israel has no official religion. However, the definition of the state as Jewish creates a strong connection as well as a conflict between state law and religious law. Political interaction of different parties keeps the balance between state and religion largely as it existed during the British Mandate. The Gavison-Medan Covenant is a proposal to reform the status quo in order to reinforce the state's Jewish character while reducing religious coercion.

Homeland for the Jewish people
The 1917 Balfour Declaration, referred to "the establishment in Palestine of a national home for the Jewish people". The 1922 Churchill White Paper clarified that "Phrases have been used such as that Palestine is to become 'as Jewish as England is English.' His Majesty's Government regard any such expectation as impracticable and have no such aim in view. They would draw attention to the fact that the terms of the Declaration referred to do not contemplate that Palestine as a whole should be converted into a Jewish National Home, but that such a Home should be founded 'in Palestine.'"

The concept of a national homeland for the Jewish people is enshrined in Israeli national policy and reflected in many of Israel's public and national institutions. The concept was adopted in the Declaration of the Establishment of the State of Israel on 14 May 1948 as the objective of the establishment of modern Israel. The principle was given legal effect in the Law of Return, which was passed by the Knesset on 5 July 1950, and stated "Every Jew has the right to come to this country as an oleh." This was modified in 1970 to include non-Jews with a Jewish grandparent, and their spouses.

Jewish state or a state of Jews?

There has been ongoing debate in Israel on the character of the state, regarding whether it should enshrine more Jewish culture, encourage Judaism in schools, and enshrine certain laws of Kashrut and Shabbat observance. This debate reflects a historical divide within Zionism and among the Jewish citizens of Israel, which has large secular and traditional/Orthodox minorities as well as a majority which lies somewhere in between.

Secular Zionism, the historically dominant stream, is rooted in a concept of the Jews as a people that have a right to self-determination. Another reason sometimes submitted for such establishment was to have a state where Jews would not be afraid of antisemitic attacks and live in peace. But such a reason is not a requirement of the self-determination right and so is subsidiary to it in secular Zionist thinking.

Religious Zionists, who believe that religious beliefs and traditional practices are central to Jewish peoplehood, counter that assimilating to be a secular "nation like any other" would be oxymoronic in nature, and harm more than help the Jewish people.  They seek instead to establish what they see as an "authentic Jewish commonwealth" which preserves and encourages Jewish heritage.
Drawing an analogy to diaspora Jews who assimilated into other cultures and abandoned Jewish culture, whether voluntary or otherwise, they argue that the creation of a secular state in Israel is tantamount to establishing a state where Jews assimilate en masse as a nation, and therefore anathema to what they view as Jewish national aspirations. Zionism is rooted in a concept of the Jews as a nation. In this capacity, they believe that Israel has a mandate to promote Judaism, to be the center of Jewish culture and center of its population, perhaps even the sole legitimate representative of Jews worldwide.

Partisans of the first view are predominantly, though by no means exclusively, secular or less traditional.  Partisans of the second view are almost exclusively traditional or Orthodox, although they also include supporters who follow other streams of Judaism or are less traditional but conservative and would not object to a more prominent state role in promoting Jewish beliefs—although not to the point of creating a purely Halachic state.

The debate is therefore characterized by significant polarities.  Secular and religious Zionists argue passionately about what a Jewish state should represent. Post-Zionists and Zionists argue about whether a Jewish state should exist at all.  Because Israel was created within the sphere of international law as the instrument for Jewish self-determination, these polarities are captured by the questions: should Israel maintain and strengthen its status as a state for the Jewish people, or transition to being a state purely for "all of its citizens", or identify as both? And, if both, how to resolve any tensions that arise from their coexistence.  To date, Israel has steered a course between secularism and Jewish identity, usually depending on who controls the Israeli High Court of Justice.

On 19 November 2008, Israeli Foreign Minister Tzipi Livni addressed the United Jewish Communities General Assembly in Jerusalem. In her speech, she announced: "These two goals of Israel as a Jewish and a democratic state must coexist and not contradict each other. So, what does that mean, a Jewish state? It is not only a matter of the number of Jews who live in Israel. It is not just a matter of numbers but a matter of values. The Jewish state is a matter of values, but it is not just a matter of religion, it is also a matter of nationality. And a Jewish state is not a monopoly of rabbis. It is not. It is about the nature of the State of Israel. It is about Jewish tradition. It is about Jewish history, regardless of the question of what each and every Israeli citizen does in his own home on Saturdays and what he does on the Jewish holidays. We need to maintain the nature of the State of Israel, the character of the State of Israel, because this is the raison d'être of the State of Israel."

A Jewish commonwealth
Advocates of Israel becoming a more narrowly Jewish commonwealth face at least the following practical and theoretical difficulties:

 How to deal with the non-Jewish Arab minority in Israel (and the non-Jewish majority in the West Bank and Gaza).
 How to alleviate concerns of Jews in Israel who favor a relatively secular state.
 What relationship should official Judaism hold vis-à-vis the Government of Israel and vice versa?
 What role do schools play in supporting Jewish heritage, religion, culture, and state?
 How will the government be organized (theocracy, constitutional theocracy, constitutional republic, parliamentary democracy etc.)?
  Should the justice system be based on secular common law, secular civil law, a combination of Jewish and common law, a combination of Jewish and civil law, or pure Jewish law?
 On what mandate or legal principles should the constitution of a Jewish state be based?
 How to integrate the economy of the state in line with Jewish law.

Theorists who grapple with these issues focus on the future of the State of Israel and realize that although the sovereign political state has been established, there is still much work to be done in relation to the identity of the state itself.

Israeli Arabs' opinion 
A poll commissioned by the Israel Democracy Institute in 2007 found that 75% of Arab-Israelis would support a constitution that maintained Israel as a Jewish and democratic state with equal minority rights. Among the 507 people who participated in the poll, some 75 percent said they would agree with such a definition while 23 percent said they would oppose it.

Criticism
The notion that Israel should be constituted in the name of and maintain a special relationship with a particular group of people, the Jewish people, has drawn much controversy vis-à-vis minority groups living in Israel—the large number of Muslim and Christian Palestinians residing in Israel and, to the extent that those territories are claimed to be governed as part of Israel and not as areas under military occupation, in the West Bank and Gaza. For example, the Israeli National Anthem, Hatikvah, refers to Jews by name as well as alluding to the concept of Zionism, and it contains no mention of Palestinian Arab culture. This anthem therefore excludes non-Jews from its narrative of national identity. Similar criticism has been made of the Israeli flag which resembles the Tallit (a Jewish prayer shawl) and features a Star of David, universally acknowledged as a symbol of Judaism. Critics of Israel as a Jewish state, particularly a nation state, have suggested that it should adopt more inclusive and neutral symbolism.

In the course of the Cold War, the Soviet Union, its satellite states and agencies, as well as many African, Asian and Arab states,  presented the concept of Zionism and the Jewish state as an embodiment of racism, imperialism and colonialism. In 1975, the UN General Assembly Resolution 3379, which equated Zionism with racism, was passed by a vote of 72 to 35. It was partially revoked by UN General Assembly Resolution 4686 in 1991 by a vote of 111 to 25.

Linguist and political commentator Noam Chomsky makes a distinction between the concept of "a Jewish ethnic homeland in Palestine" and that of "a Jewish state" in his interview on C-SPAN, saying that he has always supported a Jewish ethnic homeland in Palestine, which is different from a Jewish state. He says that there is a strong case to be made for an ethnic homeland, but he has always been opposed to a Jewish state, for the same reasons he would be opposed to "a Christian state, or a White state, or an Islamic republic". Chomsky believes the concept of a Jewish State (or Muslim, Christian or White State) directly contradicts the concept of a democratic state as it is understood in the Western tradition, because liberal democracy is founded upon a principle in which there is no privileged citizen.

Some Jewish nationalists base the legitimacy of Israel as a Jewish state on the Balfour Declaration and ancient historical ties to the land, asserting that both play particular roles as evidence under international law, as well as a fear that a hostile Arab world might be disrespectful of a Jewish minority—alleging a variety of possible harms up to and including genocide—were Israel to become a post-national "state for all its citizens."

To many Arab and Muslim leaders, following the popular usage in their communities, even referring to Israel by its proper name has political and cultural implications, resulting in use of circumlocutions such as "the Zionist entity".

See also
 Canaanism, a competing ideology to Zionism that arose in the late 1930s
 Homeland for the Jewish people
 Proposals for a Jewish state
 A Jewish and Democratic State
 Jewish Autonomous Oblast
 Land of Israel / Palestine
 History of Israel / History of the Palestinian people
 Binational solution
 Halachic state
 Pale of Settlement

References

External links
 Jewish State.com Zionism, News, Links
 Israeli Jewish scene from ynetnews
 Israel as a Jewish state from the Jerusalem Center for Public Affairs
 'Israel a Jewish state first', says former High Court Justice Dalia Dorner

Political history of Israel
Zionism
Land of Israel
Jewish nationalism
Aliyah
Religion and government
Middle East